Holissus is a monotypic genus of Spanish woodlouse hunting spiders containing the single species, Holissus unciger. It was first described by Eugène Simon in 1882, and has only been found in France.

References

Dysderidae
Monotypic Araneomorphae genera
Taxa named by Eugène Simon